Delmiro Bernal Contreras (24 November 1923 – August 2006) was a Mexican wrestler. He competed in the men's freestyle featherweight at the 1948 Summer Olympics.

References

External links
 

1923 births
2006 deaths
Mexican male sport wrestlers
Olympic wrestlers of Mexico
Wrestlers at the 1948 Summer Olympics